Red Bluff Municipal Airport  is two miles south of Red Bluff, located just off Interstate 5 in Tehama County, California. It was previously known as Bidwell Airport. It has no scheduled airline flights; United Airlines dropped Red Bluff in 1952, Pacific Air Lines left in 1962 and the airport has had few or no airline flights since. RBL sees general aviation and occasional transient aircraft.

Facilities
The land was purchased from Tyler Graham in the late 1950s.

References

External links 

Airports in Tehama County, California